Countess of Chester may mean:

 Countess of Chester Hospital, a hospital in Chester, England
 Countess of Chester (title), a subsidiary title of the Princess of Wales

See also
 Earl of Chester